The Wizard is an American action-adventure television series created by Michael Berk, Douglas Schwartz, and Paul B. Radin, that aired on CBS from September 9, 1986 to March 12, 1987, during the 1986-1987 television season.

Premise
Simon McKay is a genius and inventor with dwarfism who chooses to spend his life as a philanthropist and innovative toymaker dedicated to preserving and protecting innocence.  CIC agent Alex Jagger is assigned to protect Simon from the evil forces who wish to use Simon's genius for their own nefarious purposes.  They are soon joined by Simon's long time friend, Tillie Russell.  Simon, Alex, and Tillie become a family unit working together through adventure and adversity, especially when it comes to defeating Simon's self-proclaimed arch-enemy, Troyan, who would rather seek revenge upon the world for his suffering from the radiation poisoning he brought upon himself than take responsibility for his own actions.

Cast

Main
 David Rappaport as Simon McKay
 Douglas Barr as Alex Jagger
 Fran Ryan as Tillie Russell

Gates McFadden appeared as an intended regular in the series pilot, but was replaced by Fran Ryan for the regular series.

Guest stars
 Macon McCalman as Linden ("El Dorado", "The Other Side")
 Roy Dotrice as Troyan ("Reunion", "Twist of Fate", "Trouble in the Stars")
 Cary-Hiroyuki Tagawa as Mr. Cheng ("Reunion", "Trouble in the Stars")
 Peter Kent as Poole ("Reunion", "Trouble in the Stars")

Episodes

Save The Wizard Campaign
Midway through the first season Michael Berk and Douglas Schwartz received word from 20th Century Fox Television that The Wizard was being abruptly canceled. Rather than simply accept this, Berk and Schwartz worked to obtain a guarantee of the series' filming continuance through the end of the season.

Immediately following this incident, Berk and Schwartz created the Save The Wizard Campaign. This campaign included making personal phone calls and sending out letters and special flyers asking fans of The Wizard to write in to the CBS Television executive office to tell what the show meant to them, as well as asking them to send letter copies to The Wizard's administrative office.  Letters and petitions poured in from all over the United States and Canada. School children and families sent in letters collectively, while adults collected signatures.

Despite the ambitious campaign, the studio executives did not change their minds regarding the cancellation. The series has yet to be released on DVD despite some fan attempts.

References

External links

The Wizard Official Fansite & Definitive Cyberhome

1986 American television series debuts
1987 American television series endings
CBS original programming
Television series by 20th Century Fox Television
Television shows set in Ohio